The Second Whitlam ministry (Labor) was the 48th ministry of the Government of Australia. It was led by the country's 21st Prime Minister, Gough Whitlam. The Second Whitlam ministry succeeded the first Whitlam ministry, which dissolved on 19 December 1972 after the final results of the federal election that took place on 2 December became known and the full ministry was able to be sworn in. The ministry was replaced by the Third Whitlam ministry on 12 June 1974 following the 1974 federal election.

The order of seniority in the second Whitlam ministry was determined by the order in which members were elected to the Ministry by the Caucus on 18 December 1972, except for the four parliamentary leaders, who were elected separately.

As of 26 February 2022, Bill Hayden and Doug McClelland are the last surviving members of the second Whitlam ministry.

Ministry

See also
 First Whitlam ministry
 Third Whitlam ministry

Notes

Ministries of Elizabeth II
Whitlam, 2
Australian Labor Party ministries
1972 establishments in Australia
1974 disestablishments in Australia
Cabinets established in 1972
Cabinets disestablished in 1974
M